Pride FC: Fighting Championships, known in Japan as simply , is a video game in the fighting genre developed by Japanese studio Anchor, Inc. based upon the Pride Fighting Championships. It was developed by Anchor Inc. and released by THQ for the PlayStation 2 in 2003.

Reception

The game received slightly "above average" reviews according to the review aggregation website Metacritic. In Japan, Famitsu gave it a score of 27 out of 40.

References

External links
 

2003 video games
Multiplayer and single-player video games
PlayStation 2 games
PlayStation 2-only games
THQ games
Mixed martial arts video games
Pride Fighting Championships
Video games developed in Japan
Video games scored by Takayuki Nakamura